The Last Days of Left Eye is a documentary directed by Lauren Lazin that premiered on VH1 and VH1 Soul on May 19, 2007. Filmed from March 30, 2002 until her death on April 25, 2002, it centered on the life, last days spent in spiritual retreat in Honduras, and accidental death of rapper and TLC member Lisa Lopes (May 27, 1971 — April 25, 2002), featuring narrative insight and commentary from interviews of the singer.

Initial accident
During the course of filming the documentary, Lisa and some acquaintances were passengers in a vehicle driven by her assistant. The van had killed a child only a few weeks prior to this accident. Lisa thought that the spirit that was haunting her killed the child by mistake.

Lopes' death
The video of Lopes' fatal accident, taken from within the Mitsubishi Montero Sport that rolled over into the grass, shows only events in the vehicle prior to the moment of impact. The coroner who performed her autopsy ruled her death an accident.

Credits
Director: Lauren Lazin
Executive Producer: Shelly Tantro
Executives for VH1: Michael Hirschorn and Brad Abramson
Producers: Reigndrop Lopes, Ronald Lopes and Kate Garfield
Associate Producers: Amy Goldberg and Steven Vannucci
Video edit: David Beinstein
Video: Todd Jones and Christofer Wagner 
Post sound: Sue Pelino and Doron Reizes
Visual Effects: Fred Salkind, Stephanie Masarsky, and Anna Toonk
Original Music: Michael Shaieb & Brent Lord, FatLab Music NYC
Audio Editor: Andrew Daniel & Marcie Roy

References

External links

The Last Days of Left Eye on Movies.com

2007 films
2007 television films
2007 documentary films
Documentary films about African Americans
Documentary films about hip hop music and musicians
Documentary films about women in music
American documentary television films
Films directed by Lauren Lazin
Films set in 2002
Films shot in Honduras
TLC (group)
2000s English-language films
2000s American films